Hannes Walter (born 2 March 1984) is a German politician for the SPD and since 2021 member of the Bundestag, the federal diet.

Life and politics 

Walter was born 1984 in the East German town of Finsterwalde and studied economics in Berlin.

Walter entered the SPD in 2003 and became member of the Bundestag in 2021.

References 

Living people
1984 births

People from Finsterwalde

Social Democratic Party of Germany politicians
21st-century German politicians
Members of the Bundestag 2021–2025